Bantumilli is a village in the Krishna district of the Indian state of Andhra Pradesh. It is the mandal headquarters of Bantumilli mandal of Machilipatnam revenue division. It is well connected by road. It is located at 28 km from Machilipatnam, 50 km from Bhimavaram and 34 km from Gudivada.

Availability
You can find each and every thing for our living aspects:Groceries, Clothes, Movie theater etc.,

Geography 
It has an average elevation of 0.5 metres (3 feet).

Demographics 

 census, the village had a population of 6,867 with 1,922 households. The total population constitute, 3,411 males and 3,456 females —a sex ratio of 1019 females per 1000 males. 673 children are in the age group of 0–6 years, of which 338 are boys and 335 are girls. The average literacy rate stands at 79.17% with 10,001 literates, significantly higher than the state average of 67.41%.

See also 
Villages in Bantumilli mandal

References 

Villages in Krishna district
Mandal headquarters in Krishna district